Imaret, sometimes also known as a darüzziyafe, is one of a few names used to identify the public soup kitchens built throughout the Ottoman Empire from the 14th to the 19th centuries. These public kitchens were often part of a larger complex known as a külliye, which could include hospices, mosques, caravanserais and colleges. The imarets gave out food that was free of charge to specific types of people and unfortunate individuals. Imarets were not invented by the Ottomans but developed under them as highly structured groups of buildings. Nonetheless, imarets indicate an appreciation of Muslim religious teachings about charity found in the Qur'an.

History 
A Waqf is an "Islamic trust" that had important associations to the imaret within the Ottoman Empire. The Waqf helped the Sultan to provide essential services to citizens. It dealt with the operation and finances of institutions such as the soup kitchens and hospitals. Doğan Kuban notes that in early Ottoman architecture the term "imaret" was employed more flexibly to denote an entire complex (like a külliye), typically with a zaviye at its center – a religious building that catered to Sufi brotherhoods. This term appears in the original waqf documents of these complexes. The Nilüfer Hatun complex in Iznik, for example, is called an "imaret" but consists of a large zaviye used for Sufi religious activities. In later periods, the term imaret came to denote more strictly a public kitchen. Late Ottoman sources referred to earlier imaret-zaviye buildings as mosques, regardless of what their waqf documents said (also reflecting the fact that many zaviyes had been converted to formal mosques by then).

The author Amy Singer mentions that the first few imarets were built in Iznik and Bursa in the 1330s. After the first couple of centuries, the number of imarets grew in the cities because the Waqf complex expanded in size. By the 1530s, there were 83 imarets in the Ottoman Empire. In addition, imarets were urban institutions that were located in the capitals of the Ottoman Empire such as Bursa, Edirne, and Istanbul. These three capitals were key locations for the Sultan to invest his time and money in, and they all had something in common: each had a castle that took central positions, the bazaar was a few hundred metres from the castle, and Ottoman neighbourhoods grew up around imarets and religious community centres. Places like Anatolia and the Balkans were also important locations for imarets because these were the centres of Ottoman rule.

Today, the only Ottoman imaret still serving its original charitable function is the Mihrişah Sultan Complex in the Eyüp neighbourhood of Istanbul, which dates from 1796 and was founded by Mihrişah Sultan, the mother of Sultan Selim III.

As charity 
Imarets served many different types of people and came to be seen as “charitable and beneficent work”. They were philanthropic institutions because they were established as part of voluntary beneficence, which was considered charity in Muslim law. In addition, distribution of food was seen as charitable work in and of itself. Imarets belong to a particular category of voluntary charity, known as sadaqa. Sadaqa as voluntary charity could take many forms, including a prayer or a blessing for the sick and disabled, or a selfless act, all contributed towards good deeds in Ottoman society.

Social hierarchy and beneficiaries 
The importance of food in the imaret has strong implications of generosity because it demonstrates the distribution of food by wealthy people to meet the needs of neighbours, fellow families, and servants. The different types of people fed in the imarets were divided along the lines of class and profession, but there were those who came to imarets as regular recipients and travellers on the move. Nonetheless, imarets were strictly run establishments that carefully evaluated and observed the movement of people and the benefits they received from eating there. Although food was distributed to different types of people, strict regulations defined who ate, what they ate, how many portions they ate, and in what order; this was the case in an imaret located in Jerusalem. For example, employees of the imaret would receive one ladle of soup and two loaves of bread.  Guests would receive one ladle of soup and one loaf of bread. The poor would receive the smallest amount of food, with only one half ladle of soup and one loaf of bread per meal. The more distinguished and prominent members would receive larger portions of food and a variety of different meals to choose from. They could also take their food home and eat it at their own tables.

The Süleymaniye complex in Istanbul has strict regulations on removing food from the imaret, but these regulations were not the same at every imaret in other places. At times there were strangers who came to imarets with buckets to collect food to take home, but these people were not on the approved list or recipients, which meant they could not take food away. Poor people who were scholars or disabled were an exception to this rule and received food that was taken to them. People who belonged to a low economic status ate with people of the same social class as them. In addition, because there was such a wide distribution of food to various citizens of the Ottoman Empire, sometimes there would be an inadequate amount of food remaining after the notable people were fed. In this case, at times, poor women and children would go unfed.

Foods 

A special menu was concocted for holidays and other special days on the Ottoman calendar. These special meals were based on ceremonial staples that were enjoyed across the empire. On occasional events everyone was entitled to dishes such as "dane (mutton and rice) and zerde (rice coloured and flavoured with saffron and sweetened with honey or sugar)." On regular days, the food served in imarets changed seasonally. The morning meal consisted of rice soup that contained butter, chickpeas, onions, and salt. The evening meal consisted of a crushed wheat soup that was made with butter.

Examples 

The first institution of this kind is said to have been founded in 1336, by Sultan Orhan I, in Iznik, Anatolia. Ever since, such imarets became an inseparable part of the urban landscape in most of the Muslim cities of the Ottoman Empire. Although many Imarets sprung up across the empire after the first one in 1336, one of the most famous was that of Hurrem Sultan, a wife of Suleiman I. Established in the late 16th century city of Jerusalem, the Haseki Sultan Imaret in Istanbul distributed around 1,000 loaves of bread daily. The recipients of  bread and soup included employees, people living in the caravansary of the imaret, the followers of a local sufi shaykh, and 400 people characterized as “poor and wretched, weak and needy." This imaret ended up becoming one of the largest and best known throughout the empire, serving a wide variety of people, including the ulama, the poor, pilgrims and the wealthy and prominent members of Jerusalem.

Another institution was the Fatih Mosque complex that was constructed in Istanbul between 1463 and 1471 by Mehmed II the Conqueror. The imaret located within this complex served a diverse group of people including dignitaries, travelers, scholars, and students from the Fatih colleges. The hospital staff members and the workers of the mosques and tombs were also fed in this complex. Once these people were fed, the food left over was given to the poor. Similar to other imarets, the Fatih imaret served rice soup in the morning and wheat soup in the evening. Travellers who stayed overnight at the hotel within the complex received honey and bread to help revitalise them after a long journey. The Fatih complex provided meals for over 160 high-ranking guests. They received meals such as dane and sometimes zerde as well. These dishes were given to the other members of the imaret only once a week. Those who were noble in rank were treated to dishes that included pumpkin jam, cinnamon and cloves. They also ate considerable portions of meat and rice.

Links with the imperial family
Imarets established by Sultans and members of the imperial household were icons of charitable donations as well as imperial power. Each institution was named after the founder; these places could not maintain the connection between those who provided charity and those who received it, as established in private homes. The imarets and the imperial household created connections to the Ottoman dynasty as a whole and the legitimacy of the empire. The public kitchen illustrated how the Ottoman Empire was able to provide benefits for different sectors of people within the empire.

See also 
Zakat, a welfare contribution to the poor and deprived people of Muslim lands

References

Citations

Bibliography

Further reading 
Barkhan, Lutfi. McCarthy, Justin. “ The Price Revolution of the Sixteenth Century: A Turning Point in the Economic History of the near East.” International Journal of Middles East Studies, Vol 6, No.1 (1975): 3-28.
Barnes, Robert. 1986. An Introduction to Religious Foundations in the Ottoman Empire. Leiden: Brill.
Griswold, William J. 1984. “A Sixteenth Century Ottoman Pious Foundation.” Journal of the Economic and Social History of the Orient 27, 2: 175-198.
Jennings. Ronald C. 1990. “Pious Foundations in the Society and Economy of Ottoman Trabzon, 1565-1640.” Journal of the Economic and Social History of the Orient 33, 3: 271-336.

Shaham, Ron. “ Christian and Jewish “Waqf” in Palestine during the Late Ottoman Period.” Bulletin of the School of Oriental and African Studies, Vol 54, No. 3 (1991): 460-472.

Architecture in the Ottoman Empire